Hollywood is a 2002 Indian Kannada science fiction film written by Upendra and directed by Dinesh Babu. It starred Upendra in a triple role as Surendra, Upendra and US 47 (a robot) along with the Australian actress Felicity Mason as Manisha and Ananth Nag. The movie was shot entirely in Gold Coast, Australia with few supporting actors and a monkey called Lakshmi, voiced by Ramesh Bhat. The movie was also dubbed into Telugu in 2003, retaining the same title.

Upendra became the first Indian actor to portray the role of an android robot in a lead role. The same story of this film that a scientist who creates an android resembling himself to help him win over a girl. But, the android falls in love with the girl and tries to eliminate his creator was copied by Shankar eight years later and Shankar directed Enthiran which had a similar theme - about a lookalike robot rebelling against his creator after falling in love with the creator's girlfriend.

Plot

Cast
 Upendra as US 47 the Android Robot, Surendra the Roboticist, & Upendra the Director who is Surendra's twin brother.
 Felicity as Manisha, M- 47
 Ananth Nag as Prof. A. D. Dass, maverick scientist
 A monkey named Melukote Seenu, voiced by Ramesh Bhat

Soundtrack

Track list

Box office
Hollywood did not have a good opening at the box office across Karnataka and set the box office on average during its initial weeks, but the film received just mixed response among the audience. The film collected  at the box office after completing 75 days of run and was declared as a Hit.

References

External links

Kannada producer Ramu's film Hollywood to star Australian actress Felicity India Today

2002 films
Android (robot) films
Robot films
2000s Kannada-language films
Films scored by Gurukiran
Indian science fiction comedy films
2000s science fiction comedy films
Films shot in California
Films directed by Dinesh Baboo
2002 comedy films